Lieutenant-General Lord Frederick FitzClarence, GCH (9 December 1799 – 30 October 1854) was a British Army officer and the third illegitimate son of King William IV by his mistress Dorothea Jordan.

Military career
FitzClarence was commissioned as an officer in the British Army in 1814. While a captain in the Coldstream Guards, FitzClarence commanded a small detachment of Guards to act in support of the police with the arrest of the Cato Street conspirators in 1820. The arrest was not straightforward, and a scuffle ensued.

Frederick FitzClarence gained the rank of Colonel in the service of the 36th (Herefordshire) Regiment of Foot. On 24 May 1831, he was granted the rank of a marquess' younger son by his father, William IV, upon the latter's ascension to the throne. Having been invested as a Knight Grand Cross of the Royal Guelphic Order (G.C.H.) that same year, he became Lieutenant-Governor of Portsmouth and General Officer Commanding South-West District in 1847, and then Commander-in-Chief of the Bombay Army in 1852. He died in office in October 1854.

Coat of arms

The coat of arms of Lord Frederick FitzClarence were the royal arms of King William IV (without the escutcheon of the Arch Treasurer of the Holy Roman Empire and without the Crown of Hanover) debruised by a baton sinister (azure(?)) charged with two anchors (or(?)).

Family
On 19 May 1821, he married Lady Augusta Boyle (d. 28 July 1876), the eldest daughter of the 4th Earl of Glasgow. They had two children:

Augusta FitzClarence (December 1824 – 18 October 1865)
William FitzClarence (b. & d. 1827)

Ancestry

References

|-
 

|-

|-

1799 births
1854 deaths
FitzClarence family
Illegitimate children of William IV of the United Kingdom
Younger sons of marquesses
36th Regiment of Foot officers
Coldstream Guards officers
British Army lieutenant generals
Equerries
Sons of kings